Coffee Swamp is a freshwater swamp located on the northern edge of Washington Island, in Door County Wisconsin and is a designated state natural area since 1994. At the center of the swamp is a small, shallow pond.

The swamp represents a boreal forest, and hosts a number of plant species including various sedges, ferns and other rare plants. Snowberry, round-leaved sundew, and pitcher plants grow in small mounded areas of sphagnum moss under some of the cedars.

Climate

Gallery

References

Swamps of Wisconsin
Protected areas of Door County, Wisconsin
Protected areas established in 1994
Landforms of Door County, Wisconsin
State Natural Areas of Wisconsin